Alexandru Lahovary (August 16, 1841 – March 4, 1897) was a member of the Romanian aristocracy, a politician and diplomat who served as the Minister of Justice, Minister of Agriculture, Industry, Trade and Property, Minister of Public Works and Minister of Foreign Affairs of Kingdom of Romania.

Life and political career
Alexandru Lahovary was the brother of Ioan Lahovary, who served as foreign minister within the Royal government, and General Iacob Lahovary, who also served as Minister of Foreign Affairs and later Minister of War. He was born to the noble boyar family of Nicolae and Eufrosina Lahovary from Râmnicu Vâlcea (maybe related to the House of Lackovic). After being tutored by private teachers, he moved to Paris to teach. In Paris, he also completed his doctoral studies in 1865. In July 1867, he entered foreign service and from July 30 until October 11, 1867, he was the general secretary of the Ministry of Foreign Affairs. Lahovary was then appointed the Minister of Justice and served in this capacity for two terms: from April 20 through December 14, 1870, and October 25, 1873, until March 30, 1876. From November 12, 1888, until March 22, 1889, he was Minister of Agriculture, Industry, Trade and Property and from March 29 through November 3, 1889, he served as the Minister of Public Works. His last ministerial position was at the Ministry of Foreign Affairs where he held the office for two terms from November 5, 1889, until February 15, 1891, and from November 27, 1891, until October 3, 1895.

Lahovary died on March 4, 1897, in Paris. The Alexandru Lahovari National College in Râmnicu Vâlcea is named after the diplomat.

See also
Foreign relations of Romania
The works of Antonin Mercié

References

1841 births
1897 deaths
Romanian Ministers of Foreign Affairs
Romanian Ministers of Agriculture
Romanian Ministers of Justice
Romanian Ministers of Public Works
Politicians from Bucharest